Tiger grass is a common name for several plants and may refer to:

Grasses
Saccharum spontaneum, native to South Asia
Thysanolaena latifolia (Thysanolaena maxima), native to Asia

Other flowering plants
Centella asiatica